Schneider's pitta (Hydrornis schneideri) is a species of bird in the family Pittidae. It is endemic to Sumatra in Indonesia.  Its natural habitat is subtropical or tropical moist montane forest. It is threatened by habitat loss. It was rediscovered in 1988 after last being seen in 1918.

References

Schneider's pitta
Birds of Sumatra
Schneider's pitta
Taxonomy articles created by Polbot